is a cold egg sauce in French cuisine, made by emulsifying hard-boiled egg yolks and mustard with a neutral oil like canola or grapeseed. The sauce is finished with chopped pickled cucumbers, capers, parsley, chervil and tarragon. It also includes hard-boiled egg whites cut in a julienne.

Classically,  may be served with boiled chicken, fish (hot or cold), calf's head, tripe, or cold terrine. Modern variations may see  paired with vegetables, too, such as asparagus, charred lettuce or leeks, or even served as a dip.

See also
Mayonnaise
Tartar sauce

Notes

French sauces
Egg-based sauces